Matti Rudolf "Masa" Perttilä (21 January 1896 – 12 May 1968) was a Finnish wrestler who competed in the 1920 Summer Olympics. He was born and died in Isokyrö.

In 1920 he won the bronze medal in the Greco-Roman middleweight competition after winning the final of the bronze medal round against Sjur Johnsen.

References

External links
 

1896 births
1968 deaths
People from Isokyrö
People from Vaasa Province (Grand Duchy of Finland)
Finnish male sport wrestlers
Olympic wrestlers of Finland
Wrestlers at the 1920 Summer Olympics
Olympic bronze medalists for Finland
Olympic medalists in wrestling
Medalists at the 1920 Summer Olympics
Sportspeople from Ostrobothnia (region)
19th-century Finnish people
20th-century Finnish people